Colún River is a river in La Unión, Chile It is fed by the Yugo Largo, Mañío and El Puente streams at the Colún Hill. The end of the river opens into the Pacific Ocean at Punta Colún, the Colún Beach inside the Valdivian Coastal Reserve.

See also 
 List of rivers of Chile

References 

Rivers of Chile
Rivers of Los Ríos Region